is a 1969 Japanese pink film directed by Kan Mukai.

Synopsis
As his investments in the stock market fail, a man finds himself in serious debt to a lecherous loan-shark named Uchiyama. The man's wife hires herself to Uchiyama to buy time for the husband to pay off the debt. After Uchiyama uses the wife to provide companionship for his mentally-impaired son, she is hit by a car, and her husband falls into despair and illness. Their daughter works as a nightclub dancer, intending to save the money to help with the debt. After her father's suicide, the girl decides to get revenge.

Cast
 Mitsugu Fujii
 Ichirō Furuoka
 Miki Hashimoto
 Keisuke Kawahigashi
 Rika Koyanagi
 Reo Mizumori
 Kumi Ōsugi
 Shūsuke Sone
 Takako Uchida

Background
Because 3.5 million yen was the budget imposed on works in the pink film genre, an all-color production had been beyond the means of directors in the 1960s. Some films had been shot partially in color, using color only for certain scenes, a practise that would continue until Nikkatsu took over the genre with its Roman porno series in 1971. Blue Film Woman was one of the first all-color pink films. Jasper Sharp writes that director Mukai's use of color in this film appears to be "making up for lost time, exploding into its super-saturated hues from the very first frame... flooded with prismatic blotches of primary reds and blues and silhouettes of naked female bodies - not unlike a more lysergically-inspired version of a Bond movie credit sequence." The style continues, Sharp writing that the film as a whole is a "highly stylised piece."

Availability and critical reception
Blue Film Woman is one of the only "pink films" from its era to survive in a 35mm format. It made its U.S. debut in September 2008, with a new print screened at the Fantastic Fest in Austin, Texas. After the viewing, twitchfilm.net judged that it is, "a great example of early pinku eiga that deserves to be seen." Its Canadian debut was at the FanTasia International Film Festival. It was shown at the fiftieth International Thessaloniki Film Festival.

Bibliography

English

Japanese

Notes

1969 films
Films directed by Kan Mukai
1960s Japanese-language films
Pink films
1960s Japanese films